The eyebrowed jungle flycatcher (Vauriella gularis) is a species of bird in the Old World flycatcher family Muscicapidae.  It is endemic to the island of Borneo (elevated areas, including the Meratus Mountains). The natural habitat of the eyebrowed jungle flycatcher is subtropical or tropical moist montane forests. It builds an open, mossy cup nest, generally in epiphytes or spiny palms.

This species was previously placed in the genus Rhinomyias but was moved to Vauriella when a molecular phylogenetic study published in 2010 found that Rhinomyias was polyphyletic.

References

External links
 Video of female feeding young

eyebrowed jungle flycatcher
Birds of East Malaysia
Endemic birds of Borneo
eyebrowed jungle flycatcher
Taxonomy articles created by Polbot
Fauna of the Borneo montane rain forests